The High Speed Low Drag (HSLD) bomb is a family of new generation short range air-dropped precision-guided munition that is currently being developed by India's Defence Research and Development Organisation (DRDO). This general-purpose bomb is made for the Indian Air Force (IAF) and can be used against the destruction of strategic high value enemy infrastructure from stand-off distances. HSLD is comparable to Mark 80 series of bombs used by United States Air Force (USAF).

Between May to June 2017, multiple test were conducted successfully for 450 kg and 500 kg class general purpose bomb (GPB) as well as of precision guided high speed low drag (PGHSLD) munition.

Description 
The Armament Research and Development Establishment (ARDE), Pune is the primary agency that started developing HSLD with the help from other DRDO laboratories to upgrade the conventional free fall unguided ordnance used by the Indian Air force (IAF) fighter pilots while Ordnance Factory Board (OFB) is the lead production agency. The development started with the aim to replace the older generation imported general purpose bombs that impose huge drag loss on fighter aircraft used by the IAF. The HSLD bomb is specially designed to productively use the higher speed of up to Mach 1.1 and wider flight envelope of newer generation NATO and Russian origin as well as Indian made aircraft. High Energy Materials Research Laboratory (HEMRL) developed the conventional type warhead that features blast, fragmentation and shaped charge for bunker buster role which uses Dentex as primary explosive for HSLD 450 and Torpex-4B mixed with RDX that act as explosive booster for HSLD 500. By feeding the target coordinates, the warhead can be used to effectively destroy runway, railway track, bridge, industrial facility, dock and bunker while able to work in the absence of GNSS input due to satellite jamming. The family of HSLD comes in two versions namely a general purpose bomb (GPB) and a precision guided high speed low drag (PGHSLD) unit under three different weight class category which features semi-active laser homing and anti-jamming satellite navigation antenna. HSLD is designed to carry a nose extension unit (NEU) with fixed canard for lift, stability and two different types of smart tail unit (STU) with individual independent fins controlled by a flight control unit (FCU) attached to a telemetry module to cover the whole spectrum of mission profile. The STU features a retarder tail unit (RTU) that is for low-level bombing missions while a ballistic tail unit (BTU) that can used for strategic high level bombing.

HSLD can be launched from variety of aircraft that are under IAF inventory like Dassault Mirage 2000, Mikoyan MiG-29, SEPECAT Jaguar, Sukhoi Su-30MKI and HAL Tejas. IAF has already successfully tested PGHSLD 500 from Su-30MKI platform.

Production facility 
Ministry of Defence (MoD) gave green light to start mass production of 500 kg general purpose bomb by Munitions India Limited at Ordnance Factory Khamaria. On 17 January 2022 under the guidance of a team from HEMRL and ARDE, the first two bombs were carefully filled with primary and secondary warhead fillings. Each GPB carries 10,300 steel shells of 15 mm diameter. Each shell can target an area of upto 50 m from place of detonation.

Trials 
Two successful developmental trials were conducted in 2013 to prove the capability of the munition with all development related works to be completed by 2014. From 22 May 2017, ARDE and IAF conducted a series of carriage as well as carriage release trials (CRT) for High Speed Low Drag 500 kg class unit, with both general purpose and precision guided variant at Pokhran range, Rajasthan. In initial carriage trial, the bomb carried sensors, telemetry and data logger while during the separate CRT session, satellite guidance units were added which flew on Su-30MKI from Jodhpur Air force Station. The bomb touched the carriage limit of 1041 km/h (0.85 mach) at 150 metre altitude on Su-30MKI that performed a 6.5 g full roll manoeuvre during the first GPB 500 trial while the PGHSLD 500 separation was carried out from an altitude of 5 km at a speed of 900 km/h (0.73 mach). Both bombs cleared the flight envelope and completed all the required parameters without any form of mechanical damage during the high speed release from the aircraft. The trials were conducted with the help of Hindustan Aeronautics Limited (HAL), Indian Air Force Test Pilot School and Centre for Military Airworthiness and Certification (CEMILAC).

Variants 
 General Purpose Bomb – 100 kg, 250 kg, 450 kg and 500 kg
 Precision Guided Bomb – 450 kg and 500 kg

Operators

Indian Air Force

References

Footnotes
  DRDO tested ATGM NAG successfully. DRDO Newsletter. August 2017 Issue.

External links 
 

Defence Research and Development Organisation
Aerial bombs of India
Targeting (warfare)
Weapon guidance